Munenori (written: 宗矩, 宗則 or 宗紀) is a masculine Japanese given name. Notable people with the name include:

, Japanese baseball player
, Japanese daimyō
, Japanese animation director
, Japanese professional wrestler
, Japanese diplomat
, Japanese swordsman

Japanese masculine given names